Studies in Political Economy is a peer-reviewed academic journal covering political economy. Although an international journal, it has an emphasis on work concerning Canada. The journal publishes three times a year electronically and appears in print once a year. It is published by Taylor and Francis and was established in 1979. It is abstracted and indexed in PAIS International, The Left Index, Sociological Abstracts, Current Contents/Social and Behavioral Science, Human Resources Abstracts, Sage Public Administration Abstracts, Journal of Economic Literature, Canadian Periodical Index, and International Political Science Abstracts.

External links

Political science journals
Economics journals
Triannual journals
Publications established in 1979
English-language journals
Taylor & Francis academic journals